Bouzy is a commune of the Marne department in northeastern France, the Montagne de Reims subregion of Champagne.

Population

Champagne
The village's vineyards are located in the Montagne de Reims subregion of Champagne, and are classified as Grand Cru (100%) in the Champagne vineyard classification.

The village of Bouzy is located in the southeast of Montagne de Reims. The slopes of the mountain occupy most of the town and up to the vineyards of Champagne and to the Black Coast.

See also
Milo of Nanteuil
Philippe de Nanteuil
Communes of the Marne department
Classification of Champagne vineyards
Montagne de Reims Regional Natural Park

References

Communes of Marne (department)
Grand Cru Champagne villages